Politics and the Life Sciences (PLS) is a peer-reviewed academic journal that was first published in 1982 with Thomas Wiegele as the editor. It is published by Cambridge University Press on behalf of the Association for Politics and the Life Sciences. Broadly speaking, PLS seeks to promote and disseminate peer-reviewed research on the relationship between biological mechanisms, broadly construed, and political behavior and institutions. It publishes rigorously conducted empirical research, both quantitative and qualitative, that tests clearly articulated theoretical assertions and rigorously argued theoretical essays that are intended to stimulate further scientific research. The journal welcomes the submission of full-length research articles and short research notes, meta-analyses, replications, introductions to new research tools, theoretical essays, and letters.

Editors 
 1981-1991 : Thomas C. Wiegele, Northern Illinois University
 1991-2001 : Gary R. Johnson, Lake Superior State University
 2001-2008 : Robert Hunt Sprinkle, University of Maryland
 2008–2016 : Erik P. Bucy, Indiana University
 2017–2020 : Margaret E. Kosal, Georgia Institute of Technology, and Tony E. Wohlers, Cameron University
 2020–present : Gregg R. Murray, Augusta University

Indexing and archiving 
The journal is indexed by International Political Science Abstracts and partially indexed in MEDLINE.

In January 2007 the journal was added to BioOne as part of its second collection BioOne.2, and in October 2008 it was added to JSTOR with a 3-year moving wall.

References

External links 
 
 Politics and the Life Sciences, BioOne

Publications established in 1982
Biology journals
Biannual journals
English-language journals
1982 establishments in the United States
Cambridge University Press academic journals
Political science journals